Thorpe Culvert railway station serves the village of Thorpe St Peter in Lincolnshire, England.

The station is now owned by Network Rail and managed by East Midlands Railway who provide all rail services.

A signal box is present at the West end of the station to supervise a level crossing, however, the station itself is unstaffed and offers limited facilities other than two shelters, bicycle storage, timetables and modern 'Help Points'. The full range of tickets for travel are purchased from the guard on the train at no extra cost, there are no retail facilities at this station.

History
The station was opened by the Wainfleet and Firsby Railway for passenger traffic on 24 October 1871 when the line opened between Firsby and Wainfleet. The passenger service was extended from Wainfleet to Skegness on 28 July 1873. 

From 1896 the Wainfleet and Firsby Railway was taken over by the Great Northern Railway. Originally a single line the route was doubled by the GNR and this reached Thorpe Culvert on 9 July 1899.

Services
All services at Thorpe Culvert are operated by East Midlands Railway.

There is no Sunday service at the station, although a normal service operates on most Bank Holidays.

References

External links

Railway stations in Lincolnshire
DfT Category F1 stations
Former Great Northern Railway stations
Railway stations in Great Britain opened in 1871
Railway stations served by East Midlands Railway
Low usage railway stations in the United Kingdom